South Cockerington is a village and civil parish in the East Lindsey district of Lincolnshire, England.

The parish church is a Grade I listed building dedicated to Saint Leonard dating from the early 14th century, and restored in 1872–73. It is built from greenstone, limestone and brick. Inside there is a 15th-century font, and an alabaster monument to Sir Adrian Scrope who died in 1623, attributed to Epiphanius Evesham.

South Cockerington Hall was demolished in 1926.

In the village were four almshouses which are now a Grade II listed house, dating from about 1890, built in red brick.

See also
North Cockerington

References

External links

"South Cockerington", Genuki.org.uk. Retrieved 27 October 2011

Villages in Lincolnshire
Civil parishes in Lincolnshire
East Lindsey District